Proteiniphilum is a Gram-negative, obligately anaerobic, proteolytic and chemoorganotrophic genus from the family of Dysgonomonadaceae.

References

Further reading 
 

Bacteroidia
Bacteria genera